Compass is an unincorporated community in West Caln Township in Chester County, Pennsylvania, United States. Compass is located at the intersection of Pennsylvania Route 10 and Pennsylvania Route 340.

The community was named after the image of a compass on the sign of a tavern.

References

Unincorporated communities in Chester County, Pennsylvania
Unincorporated communities in Pennsylvania